The Dogado, or Duchy of Venice, was the homeland of the Republic of Venice, headed by the Doge. It comprised the city of Venice and the narrow coastal strip from Loreo to Grado, though these borders later extended from Goro to the south, Polesine and Padovano to the west, Trevisano and Friuli to the north and the mouth of the Isonzo to the east.

Apart from Venice, the capital and in practice a city-state of its own, the Dogado administration was subdivided in nine districts starting at the north: Grado, Caorle, Torcello, Murano, Malamocco, Chioggia, Loreo, Cavarzere and Gambarare (in Mira). In lieu of the earlier tribunes (elected by the people) and gastalds (corresponding with the Doge), during the Republic each district was led by a patrician with the title of podestà, with the exception of Grado, headed by a Count.

It was one of the three subdivisions of the Republic's possessions, the other two being the Stato da Màr ("Sea State") and the Domini di Terraferma ("mainland domains").

Dogado was the equivalent of Ducato (duchy), the Italian city states that (unlike Venice) had a duke as hereditary head of state.

Bibliography 
 Da Mosto, Andrea: L'Archivio di Stato di Venezia, Biblioteca d'Arte editrice, Roma, 1937.
 Mutinelli, Fabio: Lessico Veneto, tipografia Giambattista Andreola, Venezia, 1852.

Territories of the Republic of Venice
1797 disestablishments in the Republic of Venice
697 establishments